The  Kansas City Chiefs season was the franchise's 23rd season in the National Football League and the 33rd overall. The Chiefs matched their 10–6 record from 1991, but were shut out by the San Diego Chargers 17–0 in the Wild Card round.

Former Seattle Seahawks quarterback Dave Krieg played well for the Chiefs passing for 3,115 yards. Defense would be the key for the Chiefs third straight playoff berth as Derrick Thomas and Neil Smith recorded 14.5 sacks each.

During the season; the Chiefs wore a "WWD" patch on their jerseys in tribute to vice president of player personnel Whitey Dovell, who died in May 1992.

Offseason

NFL draft

Personnel

Staff

Roster

Preseason

Regular season

Schedule

Note: Intra-division opponents are in bold text.

Game summaries

Week 1: at San Diego Chargers

Week 2: vs. Seattle Seahawks

Week 3: at Houston Oilers

Week 4: vs. Los Angeles Raiders

Week 5: at Denver Broncos

Week 6: vs. Philadelphia Eagles

The win over the Eagles ended the longest ever gap between two NFL teams meeting, it was the first occasion the Chiefs had opposed the Eagles since October 22, 1972, and only their second-ever matchup. This occurred because in previous seasons when the AFC West and NFC East met each other, either the Chiefs or the Eagles (but never both) finished in fifth position and did not play the ordinary set of interconference games.

Week 7: at Dallas Cowboys

Week 8: vs. Pittsburgh Steelers

Week 10: vs. San Diego Chargers

Week 11: vs. Washington Redskins

Week 12: at Seattle Seahawks

Week 13: at New York Jets

Week 14: at Los Angeles Raiders

Week 15: vs. New England Patriots

Week 16: at New York Giants

Week 17: vs. Denver Broncos

Postseason

Game summaries

AFC Wild Card Playoffs: at (3) San Diego Chargers

Standings

References

Kansas City Chiefs
Kansas City Chiefs seasons
Kansas